Don Doucette (born February 23, 1952) is an American former college basketball coach. 

During his first season coaching the UMass Lowell River Hawks, Doucette won 15 games for the first winning season in program history. He led the River Hawks to the 1988 NCAA Division II national championship. Following the season, he was hired to coach the UNC Asheville Bulldogs.

Doucette has been head coach at six schools and compiled a career record of 285 wins and 300 losses. Among his schools coached, Doucette also served as the athletic director for Chaminade and Newbury.

Head coaching record

References

1952 births
Living people
American men's basketball coaches
Central Missouri Mules basketball coaches
Chaminade Silverswords athletic directors
Chaminade Silverswords men's basketball coaches
College men's basketball head coaches in the United States
Newbury Nighthawks athletic directors
Newbury Nighthawks men's basketball coaches
New Hampshire Wildcats men's basketball coaches
Salem State Vikings men's basketball coaches
UMass Lowell River Hawks men's basketball coaches
UNC Asheville Bulldogs men's basketball coaches
University of Massachusetts Boston alumni